Heat transfer vinyl, or HTV for short, is a specialty vinyl polymer that can be used on certain fabrics and materials to create designs and promotional products. It comes in a roll or sheet form with an adhesive backing so it can be cut, weeded, and placed on a substrate for heat application. Heat transfer vinyl is made in single colors and also has special options such as patterned, glitter, flocked, holographic, glow-in-the-dark, reflective and 3D puff.

Types of heat transfer vinyl
Heat transfer vinyl comes in single colors, in the specialty options listed above, in full-color pattern options, and in a printable version that must be used with solvent ink & a solvent printer. It is best used for simple designs with minimal colors since each individual color or pattern used in the design must be cut, weeded, and heat pressed. Certain heat transfer vinyl can be layered to form multi-colored designs. The more layers involved, the harder it is to match up each to achieve the end result. Heat transfer vinyl cannot be used for full-color pictures or anything with gradients. There are other applications for those options.

Heat transfer vinyl can be used to create special effects with its glitter, flocked, holographic, glow-in-the-dark, and 3D puff options. The layering of these types of vinyl is dependent on the type of vinyl used.

Heat transfer vinyl is available anywhere from small sheets, to large "master" rolls, that can be up to 60" x 50 yards. Typical sizes are 15" and 19" wide rolls in 1 yard, 5 yard, 10 yard, 25 yard, and 50-yard lengths.

Usage
Heat transfer vinyl is traditionally placed on textile products. Because of the nature of the way the vinyl is applied, it must be used on products that can take the heat and pressure required to make the transfer adhere properly. For fabrics and clothing, typically this is temperatures in the range of 250-300 deg Fahrenheit, or 120-150 degrees Celsius. The product (also known as a substrate) will also need to hold up under the clamping action and pressure of the heat press.

Each heat transfer vinyl manufacturer will list what products can be used for each type of vinyl. Fabrics such as cotton, cotton/polyester blends, polyester, and canvas work well with heat transfer vinyl. There are types of vinyl that can also be used with nylon and leather. However, products such as paper and plastics do not work well because they cannot take the heat required to adhere the vinyl to the substrate. It is very important to make sure the correct vinyl type is used with the correct substrate.

Equipment
Equipment needed to work with heat transfer vinyl includes design software and a vinyl cutter.
Desktop cutters are suitable for low volume and low budget while standalone cutters are more appropriate for higher volumes. Print/cut printers have the ability to do printed vinyl.

Weeding tools are used to remove the heat transfer vinyl that is not going to be pressed onto the product from its adhesive carrier sheet. A heat press or iron is used to transfer the vinyl onto the product. Heat presses have the ability to set a specific temperature and pressure level to suit a specific vinyl and is recommended for professional results.

Durability
Heat transfer vinyl should last the lifetime of the product if it is attached to the substrate according to the manufacturer's instructions.

References

Vinyl polymers
Heat transfer